Too Big to Know: Rethinking Knowledge Now That the Facts Aren't the Facts, Experts Are Everywhere, and the Smartest Person in the Room Is the Room is a non-fiction book by the American technology writer David Weinberger published in 2012 by Basic Books.

Overview
It describes the World Wide Web-enabled shift in the production, transmission, reception, and storage of knowledge in the early 21st century. Weinberger discusses topics such as expertise, echo chambers, open government, the WELL, Debian, the U.S. Army's Center for the Advancement of Leader Development and Organizational Learning; and the writing of Charles Darwin (On the Origin of Species) and Nicholas G. Carr ("Is Google Making Us Stoopid?"). He argues that "networked knowledge brings us closer to the truth about knowledge."



See also
 Knowledge ecosystem

References

Further reading

External links
 Official website
 Basic Books webpage for Too Big to Know
 

Books about the Internet
Networks
2012 non-fiction books
Books about books
American non-fiction books
Web 2.0
Works about information
Basic Books books